Tristan Tulen (born 22 July 1991) is a Dutch left-handed épée fencer. He won the silver medal in the men's épée event at the 2022 European Fencing Championships held in Antalya, Turkey.

Career 

He won one of the bronze medals in the men's épée event at the 2013 Summer Universiade held in Kazan, Russia. He also competed in the men's individual épée and men's team épée events at the 2017 Summer Universiade held in Taipei, Taiwan.

He competed in several editions of the men's épée event at the World Fencing Championships. He competed in the men's épée event at the 2011 World Fencing Championships and in the same event at the 2013 World Fencing Championships. A few years later, he also competed in the men's épée event at the 2017 World Fencing Championships and in the same event at the 2018 World Fencing Championships. At the Grand Prix of Cali, Colombia in 2019, he won a bronze medal. In 2022, he won the silver medal in the men's épée event at the European Fencing Championships held in Antalya, Turkey.

Personal life 

His brother Rafaël Tulen is also a competitive fencer.

References

External links 

 

Living people
1991 births
Place of birth missing (living people)
Dutch male épée fencers
Universiade medalists in fencing
Universiade bronze medalists for the Netherlands
Medalists at the 2013 Summer Universiade
Competitors at the 2017 Summer Universiade
20th-century Dutch people
21st-century Dutch people